Pezzullo is a surname. Notable people with the surname include:

Lawrence Pezzullo (1926-2017), former American ambassador to Uruguay and Nicaragua
Mike Pezzullo, Australian public servant
Phaedra Pezzullo (born 1974), American author and scholar
Pretzel Pezzullo (1910–1990), American baseball player